Robert Sharp (born September 10, 1988) is an active Canadian professional wrestler, better known by his ring name "Lion Warrior" Bobby Sharp. He is currently working for numerous companies across Canada including Atlantic Grand Prix Wrestling, High Impact Wrestling Canada, Monster Pro Wrestling, and Real Canadian Wrestling. Sharp is a Cauliflower Alley Club Future Legend award winner (and the third Canadian to win the award) and a Canadian National Wrestling Association (CNWA) National Champion (2012).

Professional wrestling career
Bobby Sharp had his first professional wrestling match at the age of 14 in Edmonton, Alberta for Monster Pro Wrestling. He continued his career as the one of the youngest active Canadian Wrestlers in history, and became the youngest Canadian Jr. Heavyweight Champion ever in March, 2005 at age 16. He would go on to win the championship a second time in July of the same year.  It was also in 2005 that the Edmonton Combative Sports Commission voted Sharp as the Professional Wrestler of the Year, and he remains the youngest recipient to win that award to date.

Independent wrestling (2003-present)
Bobby Sharp has been a regular on the Canadian Independent wrestling scene for the better part of ten years. During which he has competed for World Wrestling Entertainment, Monster Pro Wrestling, Prairie Wrestling Alliance, Elite Canadian Championship Wrestling, High Impact Wrestling Canada, Stampede Wrestling, Atlantic Grand Prix Wrestling, Global Force Wrestling, Canadian Wrestling Elite, Action Wrestling Entertainment, Wrestling Fan Xperience, Canadian National Wrestling Alliance, Hart Legacy Wrestling, Destiny Wrestling, and Border City Wrestling among many other companies. In 2013 Sharp was booked in the maritimes to tour for the reboot of Atlantic Grand Prix Wrestling. He continued touring alongside Rene Dupree as the "Canadian Outlawz.

Can-Am School
In 2016, Sharp moved to Ontario to further his training with Scott D'Amore and Johnny Devine.

Ontario Wrestling
Bobby Sharp debuted for Global Force Wrestling in a tag team match with partner Cody Deaner at the October 2nd Global Showdown 2016 event in Mississauga. The event was taped for TV.

Personal life
Sharp is in a long time relationship with fellow wrestler Kat Von Heez. In 2015 they both auditioned for the WWE series Tough Enough.

On December 24, 2015; Sharp proposed to longtime girlfriend Von Heez.

Championships and accomplishments
All-Star Wrestling - British Columbia
ASW Tag Team Championship (1 time) - with Tyler James (current)
Canadian National Wrestling Alliance
CNWA National Championship (1 time)
Cauliflower Alley Club
Future Legend Award (2013)
Edmonton Combative Sports Commission
Edmonton Combative Wrestler of the Year (2005)
High Impact Wrestling
HIW Central Canadian Heavyweight Championship (2 times, current)
HIW Wildside Provincial Championship (1 time)
Principal Pound "School of Hard Knocks" Memorial Battle Royal (2019)
Monster Pro Wrestling
MPW Heavyweight Championship (1 time)
MPW Junior Heavyweight Championship (2 times)
Pure Power Wrestling
PPW Heavyweight Championship (2 times)
Prairie Wrestling Association
PWA Canadian Tag Team Championship (1 time) - with Scotley Crue
Pro Wrestling Illustrated
PWI ranked him #376 of the top 500 singles wrestlers in the PWI 500 in 2014
Real Canadian Wrestling
RCW British Commonwealth Championship (1 time)
RCW Canadian Heavyweight Championship (1 time)
RCW Lightweight Championship (1 time)

References

External links 
 Bobby Sharp's profile at Cagematch.net

1988 births
Living people
21st-century professional wrestlers
Canadian male professional wrestlers
Professional wrestlers from Alberta
Sportspeople from Edmonton
Sportspeople from Sherwood Park